The  is a tracked armored mortar carrier that has  been in service with the Japan Ground Self-Defense Force (JGSDF) since 1996. The official abbreviation for the vehicle is 120MSP and the common name is Jisou RT or Jisou 120 mota in JGSDF. It is nicknamed God Hammer.

See also 
 Type 60 81 mm self-propelled mortar
 Type 60 107 mm self-propelled mortar

References

Further reading

External links

Japan Ground Self-Defense Force
Tracked mortars
Armoured fighting vehicles of Japan
Artillery of Japan
Military vehicles introduced in the 1990s